is a railway station on the Hidaka Main Line in Mukawa, Hokkaido, Japan, operated by the Hokkaido Railway Company (JR Hokkaido).

Services on the  section of the line between Mukawa and  have been suspended indefinitely since January 2015 due to storm damage.

History
The station opened on 1 October 1913. With the privatization of Japanese National Railways (JNR) on 1 April 1987, the station came under the control of JR Hokkaido.

See also
 List of railway stations in Japan

References

Railway stations in Hokkaido Prefecture
Railway stations in Japan opened in 1913